Torsten Frank Spittler (born 1962) is a German football manager. He was managed the Bhutan national football team. He was head coach of the Nepal national team in 1999. He started his career as a youth coach before becoming an assistant coach for the Germany Under-16 national team.

Coaching career
Spittler has been the football technical director in Mozambique. He was named Talent Development and Performance Expert for the Oman Football Association in October 2015.

He was the Perak FA manager for the 2000 season. He has also worked as coach and technical director for football in various countries such as Nepal, Yemen, Sierra Leone, India and Canada in conjunction with German Foreign Office, German Football Association (DFB) and Bavarian Football Association (BFV). From 2006 to 2007, he was head coach of Canadian side Okanagan Challenge of the Pacific Coast Soccer League after previously working in Canada as a touring-coach for the Alberta Soccer Association in 1999.

On 1 October 2016, Spittler became the head coach of Bhutan.

References

External links
 Interview Torsten Spittler (in German)

German football managers
Living people
1962 births
German expatriate sportspeople in Yemen
German expatriate football managers
German expatriate sportspeople in Nepal
German expatriate sportspeople in Canada
German expatriate sportspeople in Myanmar
German expatriate sportspeople in Bhutan
German expatriate sportspeople in Mozambique
German expatriate sportspeople in Sierra Leone
Bhutan national football team managers
Nepal national football team managers
Perak F.C. managers
German expatriate sportspeople in Malaysia
Expatriate soccer managers in Canada
Expatriate football managers in Mozambique
Expatriate football managers in Sierra Leone
Expatriate football managers in Myanmar
Expatriate football managers in Nepal
Expatriate football managers in Yemen
Expatriate football managers in Bhutan
Expatriate football managers in Malaysia